Helmar Lewis (February 7, 1900 – March 6, 1999) was an American politician and lawyer.

Born in McFarland, Wisconsin, Lewis was raised on a farm. He served in the United States Army during World War I. He received his bachelor's degree and law degrees from University of Wisconsin–Madison. He served as District Attorney of Grant County, Wisconsin, city attorney and mayor of Boscobel, Wisconsin. He served in the Wisconsin State Senate from 1941 to 1944 as a Republican, and resigned to work in the Office of Price Administration in June 1944. He then worked in the Wisconsin Public Service Commission as a lawyer. He died in Beloit, Wisconsin.

Notes

1900 births
1999 deaths
People from McFarland, Wisconsin
People from Boscobel, Wisconsin
University of Wisconsin–Madison alumni
University of Wisconsin Law School alumni
Wisconsin lawyers
Mayors of places in Wisconsin
Wisconsin state senators
20th-century American lawyers
20th-century American politicians